Allahqoli (also Romanized as Qal‘eh-ye Allāhqolībeyk and Qal‘eh-ye Allāhqolībeyg) is a village in Rahjerd-e Sharqi Rural District, Salafchegan District, Qom County, Qom Province, Iran. At the 2006 census, its population was 39, in 12 families.

References 

Populated places in Qom Province